Canada Outdoors is a Canadian nature television series which aired on CBC Television in 1967.

Premise
Each episode featured two films on the wilderness covering such topics as birds, canoe travel and northwest Ontario tourism.

Scheduling
This half-hour series was broadcast Wednesdays at 5:30 p.m. (Eastern) from 5 July to 27 September 1967. It was rebroadcast 10:00 a.m. daily from 4 to 8 October 1971.

References

External links
 

CBC Television original programming
1967 Canadian television series debuts
1971 Canadian television series endings